The Cleveland Street station (formerly Cleveland Avenue station) is a skip-stop station on the BMT Jamaica Line of the New York City Subway in Brooklyn. It is served by the J train at all times. The Z train skips this station when it operates.

History 
This elevated station was originally built by the Brooklyn Elevated Railroad as the first station to be built along the Cypress Hills extension of the Lexington Avenue Elevated line, which was also shared by the Broadway Elevated east of Gates Avenue. The station opened on May 30, 1893. The station has been exclusively for the Jamaica Line since the closure of the Lexington Avenue Line in 1950.

The station was closed for renovations in the mid-2000s. As part of the station renovation project, the stairs were rehabilitated, the floors were renewed, major structural repairs were made, new canopies were installed, the area around the station booth was reconfigured, the platform edge strips were replaced, walls were replaced, and a high-quality public address system was installed. The renovation cost $8.41 million.

Station layout

The station has two tracks and one island platform. The canopy is located at the west end of the platform and is short and has arched supports.

Exit
The station's only entrance and exit is a station house at the west end of the platform. It has a bank of two turnstiles, token booth, and one staircase going down to an elevated passageway beneath the tracks. Outside of fare control, there are two stairs, one to each western corner of Fulton and Cleveland Streets.

See also
Substation 401

References

External links 

 
 Station Reporter — J Train
 The Subway Nut — Cleveland Street Pictures 
 MTA's Arts For Transit — Cleveland Street (BMT Jamaica Line)
 Cleveland Street entrance from Google Maps Street View
Platform from Google Maps Street View

BMT Jamaica Line stations
1893 establishments in New York (state)
New York City Subway stations in Brooklyn
Railway stations in the United States opened in 1893
Cypress Hills, Brooklyn